Leandro Depetris (born 24 January 1988 in Rafaela) is an Argentine professional footballer, who currently plays for Tiro Federal.

Career

Depetris started his career at Club Atlético Brown San Vicente and played later for Newell's Old Boys de Rosario. In summer 2000 in the age of eleven signed for Italian Serie A side AC Milan and was 2003 loaned to River Plate. He was signed by Brescia in summer 2005, but due to FIFA rule, his transfer would be made official after his 18th birthday. He scored in his debut and only appearances in 2005-06 Serie B season. De Petris played the 2010/2011 season for A.C. Chioggia Sottomarina and US Sanremese Calcio 1904.

Notes

External links
Statistics at Guardian Stats Centre

1988 births
Living people
A.S.D. Gallipoli Football 1909 players
Argentine footballers
Argentine expatriate footballers
Brescia Calcio players
Club Atlético Independiente footballers
Argentine Primera División players
Serie B players
Expatriate footballers in Italy
Association football forwards
People from Rafaela
Argentine expatriate sportspeople in Italy
Sportspeople from Santa Fe Province